Mnogoozyorny is a rural locality (a settlement) and the administrative center of Yuzhakovsky Selsoviet, Troitsky District, Altai Krai, Russia. The population was 380 as of 2013. It was founded in 1939. There are 16 streets.

Geography 
Mnogoozyorny is located 45 km southwest of Troitskoye (the district's administrative centre) by road. Yuzhakovo is the nearest rural locality.

References 

Rural localities in Troitsky District, Altai Krai